The 116th Independent Field Battery, Royal Canadian Artillery is a Canadian Army Reserve independent artillery battery based in Kenora, Ontario, which forms part of the 3rd Canadian Division's 38 Canadian Brigade Group. The battery parades at the Kenora Armoury, 800-11th Avenue North, Kenora, Ontario.

Lineage

The Kenora Light Infantry 

In 1908, the 98th Regiment was created. After the regiment was renamed multiple times during the 1920, it was split into two in 1936. After the split, the 17th Medium Battery remained in service until 1946. During the 1940s to 1980, the 16th Medium Battery was renamed multiple times and merged with the 209th (Reserve) Field Battery before becoming the 116th Independent Field Battery in 1981.

11th Medium Battery (Howitzer), RCA 
In 1920, the 11th Siege Battery was created. Following multiple renames from the 1920 to 1940s, the battery was merged into the 116th Independent Field Battery when it was known as the 16th Medium Battery in 1946.

Perpetuations
The 116th Independent Field Battery, RCA, perpetuates the 94th Battalion (New Ontario), CEF, and No. 11 Canadian Siege Battery, Canadian Garrison Artillery, CEF.

Operational history

The Great War
Versions of the 116th fought during World War I in Great Britain and France.

The Second World War
The 17th Field Regiment, RCA was mobilized originally as two batteries, the 37th Battery and the 60/76 Battery.  The 37th Battery was recruited as three troops, A troop at Fort William and Port Arthur, B troop at Fort Frances Frances and Kenora, and C troop at Portage la Prairie.  The 60/76 Battery was recruited entirely from Saskatchewan, half coming from Aneroid and other points in Western and South Western Saskatchewan while the second half came from Indian Head and the CPR main line district East of Regina.

The Non-Permanent Active Militia units from which these two active service batteries were formed, were the 7th Medium Artillery Brigade which consisted of the 16th Battery centred at Kenora, the 17th Battery at Fort Frances and the 18th Battery at Port Arthur, the 26 Field Artillery Brigade from Brandon, the 10th and 22nd Field Artillery Brigades of South Saskatchewan.  These units provided the NCO and officer nucleus which was responsible for the initial training and the transformation from a civilian to a soldier regiment.

The 17th Regiment, RCA was a three-battery, 24 gun regiment.  Each of the three batteries of the regiment contained two troops.  The 37th Battery made up Charlie and Dog Troops.

Equipment

 Commercial Utility Cargo Vehicle - logistics and transport
 Iltis - transport

A Universal Carrier and M114 155 mm howitzer are found along the side and main entrance to the Armoury.

References

Artillery batteries
Kenora
Sub-units of Regiments of Canada